The 1910–11 Massachusetts Agricultural College Aggies men's ice hockey season was the 3rd season of play for the program.

Season
Mass Agg continued to improve in the standings, rising to 7 wins in their junior year and winning their first game against a major program (Yale).

Roster

Standings

Schedule and Results

|-
!colspan=12 style=";" | Regular Season

References

UMass Minutemen ice hockey seasons
Massachusetts Agricultural College
Massachusetts Agricultural College
Massachusetts Agricultural College
Massachusetts Agricultural College